The Children of Húrin is an epic fantasy novel which forms the completion of a tale by J. R. R. Tolkien. He wrote the original version of the story in the late 1910s, revised it several times later, but did not complete it before his death in 1973. His son, Christopher Tolkien, edited the manuscripts to form a consistent narrative, and published it in 2007 as an independent work. The book contains 33 illustrations by Alan Lee, eight of which are full-page and in colour.  The story is one of three "great tales" set in the First Age of Tolkien's Middle-earth, the other two being Beren and Lúthien and The Fall of Gondolin.

Overview

The history and descent of the main characters are given as the leading paragraphs of the book, and the back story is elaborated upon in The Silmarillion. It begins five hundred years before the action of the book, when Morgoth, a Vala and the prime evil power, escapes from the Blessed Realm of Valinor to the north-west of Middle-earth. From his fortress of Angband he endeavours to gain control of the whole of Middle-earth, unleashing a war with the Elves that dwell in the land of Beleriand to the south.

However, the Elves manage to stay his assault, and most of their realms remain unconquered; one of the most powerful of these is Doriath, ruled by Thingol. In addition, after some time the Noldorin Elves forsake Valinor and pursue Morgoth to Middle-earth in order to take vengeance upon him. Together with the Sindar of Beleriand, they proceed to lay siege to Angband, and establish new strongholds and realms in Middle-earth, including Hithlum ruled by Fingon, Nargothrond by Finrod Felagund and Gondolin by Turgon.

Three centuries pass, during which the first Men appear in Beleriand. These are the Edain, descendants of those Men who have rebelled against the rule of Morgoth's servants and journeyed westward. Most of the Elves welcome them, and they are given fiefs throughout Beleriand. The House of Bëor rules over the land of Ladros, the Folk of Haleth retreat to the forest of Brethil, and the lordship of Dor-lómin is granted to the House of Hador. Later, other Men enter Beleriand, the Easterlings, many of whom are in secret league with Morgoth.

Eventually Morgoth manages to break the Siege of Angband in the Battle of Sudden Flame. The House of Bëor is destroyed and the Elves and Edain suffer heavy losses; however, many realms remain unconquered, including Dor-lómin, where the lordship has passed to Húrin Thalion.

Plot summary

Túrin, son of Húrin is a Man who lived in Dor-lómin. Húrin was taken prisoner by Morgoth after the Battle of Unnumbered Tears and during his imprisonment Túrin was sent by his mother, Morwen, to live in the Elf-realm Doriath for protection. In his absence Morwen gave birth to Niënor, a girl. Morgoth had placed a curse upon Húrin and all his family whereby evil would befall them for their whole lives.

King Thingol of Doriath takes Túrin as a foster-son. During his time in Doriath Túrin befriends Beleg, and the two become close companions. Túrin accidentally causes the death of Saeros, who attempts to jump a ravine while fleeing a wrothful Túrin but falls to his death. Túrin refuses to return to Doriath to face judgement and opts for exile and life as an outlaw. Thingol pardons the absent Túrin and gives Beleg leave to search for him and bring him back to Doriath.

Túrin meanwhile joins a band of outlaws in the wild and eventually becomes their captain. Beleg locates the band while Túrin is absent, and the outlaws leave him tied to a tree until he agrees to give them information. Túrin returns in time to cut Beleg free and, horrified by the outlaws' actions, resolves to forsake the cruel habits he has fallen into. Beleg delivers the message of the king's pardon but Túrin refuses to return to Doriath. Beleg returns to aid Doriath's defence.

Túrin and his men capture Mîm, a Petty-dwarf, who leads them to the caves at Amon Rûdh. Beleg decides to return to Túrin, who welcomes him. The outlaws resent the elf's presence and Mîm, disliking Elves, grows to hate him. Mîm betrays the outlaws to orcs, leading the orcs to the caves where Túrin's company is taken unawares. The entire band is killed, save for Beleg and Túrin. They take Túrin off towards Angband, leaving Beleg chained to a rock. Beleg escapes his bonds and pursues Túrin.

Beleg happens across a mutilated elf, Gwindor of Nargothrond, sleeping in the forest of Taur-nu-Fuin. They enter the orc camp at night and carry Túrin, asleep, from the camp. Beleg begins to cut Túrin's bonds with his sword Anglachel, but the sword slips in his hand and cuts Túrin. Túrin, mistaking Beleg for an orc, kills Beleg with his own sword. When a flash of lightning reveals Beleg's face, Túrin realises his mistake and falls into a frenzy.  He refuses to leave Beleg's body until morning, when Gwindor is able to bury the elf. Túrin takes Anglachel but remains witless with grief.

Túrin and Gwindor proceed to Nargothrond. There Túrin gains the favour of King Orodreth, and after leading the Elves to considerable victories, he becomes Orodreth's chief counsellor and commander of his forces. Against all counsel Túrin refuses to hide Nargothrond from Morgoth or to retract his plans for full-scale battle. Morgoth sends an orc-army under the command of the dragon, Glaurung, and Nargothrond is defeated. The orcs, crossing easily over the bridge that Túrin had built, sack Nargothrond and capture its citizens. Túrin returns as the prisoners are to be led away by the orcs, and encounters Glaurung. The dragon enchants and tricks him into returning to Dor-lómin to seek out Morwen and Niënor instead of rescuing the prisoners—among whom is Finduilas, Orodreth's daughter, who loved him.

In Dor-lómin Túrin learns that Morwen and Niënor have long been in Doriath, and that Glaurung deceived him into letting Finduilas go to her death. He tracks Finduilas' captors to the forest of Brethil, only to learn that she was murdered by the orcs. Grief-stricken, Túrin seeks sanctuary among the folk of Haleth, who maintain a resistance against Morgoth. In Brethil Túrin renames himself Turambar, "Master of Doom" in Quenya, and gradually supplants Brandir, Brethil's lame Chieftain.

In Doriath Morwen and Niënor hear rumours of Túrin's deeds, and Morwen determines either to find Túrin or to hear news of his death. Against the counsel of Thingol she rides out of Doriath alone, and Niënor conceals herself among the riders whom Thingol sends under Mablung to follow and protect Morwen. At Nargothrond, Mablung encounters Glaurung, who scatters the elves. Finding Niënor alone, Glaurung discovers her identity and enchants her so that her mind is made blank; she forgets everything, including her name and how to speak.

Mablung attempts to return to Doriath alone with Niënor. The two become stranded in the wilderness, and in an orc attack, Niënor runs into the woods and is lost. Eventually she collapses near Brethil on the grave of Finduilas, where Turambar finds her.  He brings her back to the town, and she gradually recovers the use of speech, although she has no memory of her past life. Niënor and Turambar develop a strong attraction.  They marry, not realising their kinship, and Niënor becomes pregnant.

After some time of peace, Glaurung returns to exterminate the men of Brethil. Turambar leads an expedition to cut him off, and stabs Glaurung from beneath while the dragon is crossing a ravine. As Glaurung is dying on the bank of the ravine, Turambar pulls his sword from the dragon's belly, and blood spurts onto his hand and burns him. Overwhelmed with pain and fatigue, he faints. Niënor finds him and mistakes his swoon for death. In a last effort of malice Glaurung opens his eyes and informs her that she and Turambar are brother and sister. Glaurung then dies, and his spell of forgetfulness passes from Niënor. Remembering her entire life and knowing that her unborn child was begotten in incest, she throws herself from the nearby cliff into the river Taeglin and is washed away. When Turambar wakes, Brandir informs him of Niënor's death and of their true relationship as siblings, as he had overheard the dragon's words. Turambar then accuses Brandir of leading Niënor to her death and publishing the lies of Glaurung. He then executes Brandir. Mablung confirms Brandir's tale, and Turambar takes his own life upon his sword.

The main part of the narrative ends with the burial of Túrin. Appended to this is an extract from The Wanderings of Húrin, the next tale of Tolkien's legendarium. This recounts how Húrin is at last released by Morgoth and comes to the grave of his children. There he finds Morwen, who has also managed to find the place, but now dies in the arms of her husband.

Publication history
The Children of Húrin was published on 17 April 2007, by HarperCollins in the United Kingdom and Canada, and by Houghton Mifflin in the United States. Alan Lee, illustrator of other fantasy works by J. R. R. Tolkien (The Hobbit and The Lord of the Rings) created the jacket painting, as well as the illustrations within the book. Christopher Tolkien also included an excursus on the evolution of the tale, several genealogical tables, and a redrawn map of Beleriand.

J.R.R. Tolkien wrote that the setting is intended to be our Earth several thousand years ago, although the geographical and historical correspondence with the real world is tenuous. The lands of Middle-earth were populated by Men and other humanoid races: Elves, Dwarves, and Orcs, as well as divine beings, Valar and  Maiar. The story concentrates on a man of the House of Hador, Túrin Turambar, and his sister Niënor Níniel, who are cursed along with their father Húrin by the Dark Lord Morgoth. The events take place more than 6,500 years before the War of the Ring.

According to the Tolkien Estate:

Influences
The story is mainly based on the legend of Kullervo, a character from the compilation of Finnish folklore poems called Kalevala. Tolkien drew inspiration from the Kalevala for "The Story of Kullervo" in 1914, which was to become the model for his tale of Túrin. Túrin (like Kullervo) also resembles Sigmund, the father of Sigurd in the Volsunga saga, in the incestuous relationship he had with his sister. In Richard Wagner's opera, Die Walküre (also drawn in part from the Volsung myths), Siegmund and Sieglinde are parallels of Túrin and Niënor. Túrin further resembles Sigurd himself, as both achieve great renown for the slaying of a dragon of immense power and magic. Turin's suicide following an exchange of words with his sword is lifted essentially unchanged from Kullervo's tale in Kalevala.

Túrin's resemblance to figures from Classical and Medieval tales can be confirmed by a letter which Tolkien wrote to Milton Waldman, a publisher from HarperCollins, concerning the fate of his works:

The moral issues in The Children of Húrin have been compared to Tolkien's analysis of The Battle of Maldon that shows Tolkien's interest in the "theory of courage", and distinguish between arrogance and true courage. Túrin's decision to build a bridge at Nargothrond which enables the invasion by Morgoth's forces resembles the character Byrthtnoth from The Battle of Maldon.

Themes and interpretation
The themes explored in the story include evil, free will and predestination. The book reflects also on heroism and courage. It has been suggested that Túrin's character is not only shaped by Morgoth's curse but that he himself is also partly responsible for his actions. The curse cannot completely control his free will, and Túrin displays traits like arrogance, pride and a desire for honour, that eventually cause the doom of his allies and family. It has elements of revenge tragedies such as revenge (avenging Glaurung), madness (Túrin's madness after finding out who Níniel was), multiple deaths (Saeros, Beleg, Gwindor, Finduilas, Brodda, Niënor, Brandir) and disguise (Túrin's adopting new identities).

Writing

A brief version of the story formed the base of chapter XXI of The Silmarillion, setting the tale in the context of the wars of Beleriand. Although based on the same texts used to complete the new book, the Silmarillion account leaves out the greater part of the tale.

Other incomplete versions have been published in other works:
 The Narn i Hîn Húrin in Unfinished Tales.
 Items in The History of Middle-earth series, including:
Turambar and the Foalókë, from The Book of Lost Tales
The Lay of the Children of Húrin, an early narrative poem from The Lays of Beleriand

None of these writings forms a complete and mature narrative. The published Children of Húrin is essentially a synthesis of the Narn and of the account found in The Silmarillion. The first part of The Children of Húrin (Chapters I to VII) is taken directly from the Narn with the exception of the Nírnaeth Arnoediad (Chapter II), which actually forms the twentieth chapter of The Silmarillion: this battle is only briefly mentioned either in the Narn or in the much compressed Silmarillion version (Of Túrin Turambar).

In the middle section (Chapters VII to XII), that is, from the end of Túrin's sojourn on Amon Rûdh to his return to Dor-lómin, material is mostly drawn from The Silmarillion, but is often supplemented with more complete but disconnected passages from the Narn (previously provided by Christopher Tolkien in the Appendix of Unfinished Tales). These more developed scenes include the exploits of the outlaws in Dor-Cúarthol, Túrin's romantic connection with Finduilas, his debate with Gwindor over the strategy that the Elves of Nargothrond were to adopt in their fight against Morgoth, and a much expanded account of the coming of the Elves Gelmir and Arminas to the halls of Narog. Some minor editorial work was needed, mostly to provide smooth transitions.

The last section (Chapters XII to XVIII) comes exclusively from the Narn, with the addition, at the end of the last chapter, of Húrin's release from Angband, and his last words to Morwen.

Editorial process

With the publication of The Children of Húrin, Christopher Tolkien quotes his father's own words on his fictional universe: 

Christopher Tolkien gives this explanation of his exercise of his editorial function to produce this work by his father:

Ethan Gilsdorf, reviewing The Children of Húrin, wrote of the editorial function:

Christopher Tolkien explains how the compilation of The Children of Húrin was achieved:

Christopher Tolkien had already elaborated in the Unfinished Tales on his use of the Narn and of The Silmarillion to achieve a complete tale of Túrin:

Reception

The initial reviews following the publication of The Children of Húrin were mostly positive. Likening it to a Greek tragedy, The Washington Post called it "a bleak, darkly beautiful tale" which "possesses the mythic resonance and grim sense of inexorable fate". A positive review was carried by The Independent (UK) ("dry, mad, humourless, hard-going and completely brilliant"). Bryan Appleyard of The Sunday Times (UK) set The Children of Húrin above other writings of Tolkien, noting its "intense and very grown-up manner" and "a real feeling of high seriousness". Maurice Chittenden of The Sunday Times, said that "it may merit an X-certificate" owing to the number of violent deaths. Philip Hensher in The Daily Telegraph said there were many reasons to detest the book (and enumerated them), but relents for its powerful final episode "in which an incestuous passion and a battle with a great dragon enfold each other". He disagrees with Tolkien about what gave power to his writing: Tolkien thought it was its links to antiquity; Hensher, for its modernity, referencing imperialism not feudalism, and an elf capable of evil.

The book received negative reviews from the Detroit Free Press ("dull and unfinished"), Entertainment Weekly ("awkward and immature", "impenetrable forest of names ... overstuffed with strangled syntax"), and The Guardian ("a derivative Wagnerian hero ... on a quasi-symbolic quest").

Other critics distinguished two audiences. Tom Deveson of The Sunday Times said that "although JRR Tolkien aficionados will be thrilled, others will find The Children of Hurin barely readable". Kelly Grovier from The Observer, on the other hand, stated that it "will please all but the most puritanical of his fans", referring to the scepticism about Christopher Tolkien's involvement. Jeremy Marshall of The Times generally echoed: "It is worthy of a readership beyond Tolkien devotees," although he thought it was flawed ("occasionally the prose is too stilted, the dialogue too portentous, the unexplained names too opaque"). He presupposed that: "In The Children of Húrin we could at last have the successor to The Lord of the Rings that was so earnestly and hopelessly sought by Tolkien’s publishers in the late 1950s."

Sales

The Children of Húrin debuted at number one on The New York Times Hardcover Fiction Best Seller list.

According to Houghton Mifflin, the U.S. publisher, already 900,000 copies were in print worldwide in the first two weeks, double the initial expectations of the publishers. HarperCollins, the U.K. publisher, claimed 330,000 copies were in print in the U.K. in the first two weeks.

In science
In 1999, Finnish entomologist Lauri Kaila named three species of moth, Elachista turinella, Elachista morwenella, and Elachista nienorella, after Túrin, Morwen, and Niënor respectively.

References

Sources

External links
 Statement about the book by the Tolkien Estate
 FAQ on the subject of The Children of Húrin by the Tolkien Estate
 Statement about the book by HarperCollins
 Interview about the book with Adam Tolkien (in Spanish but with an English version at the bottom of the page)
 An introduction and background on the book at Tolkien-Online.com
 The Children of Húrin FAQ
 The Children of Húrin with analysis and reviews

 
2007 British novels
2007 fantasy novels
Middle-earth books
British picture books
Novels published posthumously
Fictional families
Incest in fiction
Fiction about curses
Fiction about suicide
Fiction about memory erasure and alteration
HarperCollins books
Literary collaborations